Shivan Qaderi (a.k.a. Sayed Kamal Astam, Sayed Kamal Astom, Shwane Qadri, or Sayed Kamal Asfaram, in Kurdish: Şivan Qaderî) was an Iranian Kurd who with two other men were shot by Iranian security forces in Mahabad, on July 9, 2005. According to the claims of the opposition, the security forces then tied Qaderi's body to a Toyota jeep and dragged it through the streets. Iranian authorities confirmed that Qaderi, 
"who was on the run and wanted by the judiciary", was shot and killed while allegedly evading arrest. According to the Iranian sources he was a "criminal and smuggler" and according to the opposition groups he was an "opposition activist".

For the next six weeks, riots and protests erupted in Kurdish towns and villages throughout Western Iran such as Mahabad, Sanandaj, Sardasht, Piranshahr, Oshnavieh, Baneh, Bokan and Saqiz  (and even inspiring protests in southwestern Iran and in Baluchistan in eastern Iran) with scores killed and injured, and an untold number arrested without charge. The Iranian authorities also shut down several major Kurdish newspapers arresting reporters and editors. The Free Life Party of Kurdistan PJAK that about 50,000 people had protested after his death on the Chuwarchira Square. ROJ TV  alleges that after he was shot, Iranian soldiers tied Ghaderi's body "to a military vehicle and dragged it through the city in a clear attempt to intimidate the population and deter further protests."

References

External links
 
  بی‌بی‌سی 
   مقاله وبسایت میهن (با عکس‌های جسد شوانه قادری) 
Pictures of the body of Shivan Qaderi(stigmas of autopsy by Iranian government report)

Iranian Kurdish people
20th-century births
Year of birth missing

2005 deaths
Iranian murder victims
Deaths by firearm in Iran
People murdered in Iran